The 1997 Pepsi Independence Cup was a quadrangular ODI cricket tournament held in May 1997 to commemorate the 50th anniversary of the independence of India. It featured the national cricket teams of New Zealand, Pakistan, Sri Lanka and the hosts India. The tournament was won by Sri Lanka, which defeated Pakistan in the best-of-three finals.

Indian independence celebrations
The tournament was organised by the Board of Control for Cricket in India (BCCI) and sponsored by PepsiCo as part of the many national celebrations being held in 1997 for the 50th anniversary of India's independence from colonial rule. The Independence Cup trophy featured a gold inscribed image of Indian leader Mahatma Gandhi and his followers on the Dandi March during the 1930–31 Salt Satyagraha. The tournament concept was later emulated in Sri Lanka, which held an Independence Cup tournament to mark its 50th anniversary of independence in 1998, and in Bangladesh in 1998. The BCCI also used the tournament to celebrate 50 years of Indian cricket. Along with a television documentary on the history of Indian cricket broadcast on Doordarshan, India's Test cricket captains were honoured during the 2nd final at the Eden Gardens in Calcutta (now Kolkata) – from the then 86-year-old Lala Amarnath to the then-captain, 24-year-old Sachin Tendulkar. All the captains took a lap around the Eden Gardens in a jeep, receiving a standing ovation from the 75,000-strong assembled crowd. Each man received a silver salver, while Vijay Hazare received the C. K. Nayadu Trophy. The captains honoured included Polly Umrigar, Datta Gaekwad, Pankaj Roy, Gulabrai Ramchand, Nari Contractor, Chandu Borde, Ajit Wadekar, Bishen Singh Bedi, Srinivasaraghavan Venkataraghavan, Sunil Gavaskar, Kapil Dev, Ravi Shastri, Krishnamachari Srikkanth and Mohammad Azharuddin.

Squads

The Indian team coach and manager for the tournament was Madan Lal. Notably missing from the squad was former captain and lead batsman Mohammad Azharuddin, who was dropped. Lead pace bowler Javagal Srinath was ruled out of the first half of the tournament due to a shoulder injury. Pakistan's line-up missed regular pace bowlers Wasim Akram, Waqar Younis and spin bowler Mushtaq Ahmed, who were playing county cricket in England. The Sri Lankan team had minor changes from the team that won the 1996 World Cup under the leadership of Arjuna Ranatunga.

Points Table

Source:ESPN Cricinfo

Matches
Using the round robin format, each team played the others once. New Zealand defeated Pakistan in the tournament opener, but proceeded to lose its other matches. Similarly, India succeeded in its opening match against New Zealand, but suffered defeats to Sri Lanka and Pakistan. After its loss to New Zealand, Pakistan's victories against Sri Lanka and India enabled it to qualify for the finals. Sri Lanka lost a high-scoring match to Pakistan, but defeated New Zealand and India to reach the finals.

Finals
Pakistan and Sri Lanka squared-off in a best-of-three final series. The first final was in Chandigarh, and the second final (and if necessary, the third) was held at the Eden Gardens in Calcutta (now Kolkata). However, Sri Lanka won both the first and second finals, winning the tournament without the need for a third final to be played.

Records and awards
The player of the tournament award was Sanath Jayasuriya, who scored the most runs in the tournament, 306, with one century and two fifties, and took 5 wickets to add. Pakistan's Saqlain Mushtaq took the most wickets in the tournament, bagging 14. Pakistani batsman Saeed Anwar's innings of 194 against India in Chennai became the record for the highest runs in a single innings by any batsman in ODI cricket. The record stood until 2010, when India's Sachin Tendulkar became the first batsman in ODI history to score a 200 not out against South Africa in Gwalior.

References

1997 in cricket
International cricket competitions from 1994–95 to 1997
Indian cricket seasons from 1970–71 to 1999–2000
1997 in Indian cricket
New Zealand cricket seasons from 1970–71 to 1999–2000
Pakistani cricket seasons from 1970–71 to 1999–2000
Sri Lankan cricket seasons from 1972–73 to 1999–2000
Pepsi